Laleia United FC is a football club of East Timor of the Manatuto based in the Laleia district. The team plays in the Liga Futebol Amadora Terceira Divisão.

Competition records

Liga Futebol Amadora 
LFA Terceira 2019: 6th places in Groub A

References

Football clubs in East Timor
Football
Association football clubs established in 2019